Derek Tyler Carter (born December 30, 1991) is an American musician, singer, songwriter and record producer from Gainesville, Georgia. He is most notable for being the former vocalist and founding member of American metalcore band Issues. Carter began his musical career performing drums in local bands in Atlanta, Georgia. Following his underground success, he joined metalcore outfit Woe, Is Me, releasing their debut studio album, Number[s], in 2010, in which he left the following year.

After departing from Woe, Is Me, he began amalgamating Issues with former members of Woe, Is Me, including vocalist Michael Bohn. With Issues, they released their debut extended play (EP), Black Diamonds (2012). The following year, the band released the stand-alone single, "Hooligans". In 2014, the group released their debut full-length studio album, Issues, to critical and commercial acclaim, charting at number-nine on the U.S. Billboard 200. The group released their second EP, Diamond Dreams, on November 18, 2014. The band released their second full-length studio album, Headspace (2016), to positive acclaim, charting at number 20 on the US Billboard 200. Bohn departed from Issues in January 2018, making Carter the sole vocalist in the group's line-up. The following year, the group released their third studio album, Beautiful Oblivion. In September 2020, he left after allegations of sexual misconduct. In 2020, he co-founded the duo Emerald Royce with Attila's Chris Linck.

Carter also pursues a solo music career, having released two EPs, Leave Your Love (2015) and Moonshine Acoustic (2020), and one studio album, Moonshine (2019). He has collaborated with various other musical artists and groups including blackbear, MAX, Jamie's Elsewhere, Breathe Carolina, Hands Like Houses, Slaves, and ONE OK ROCK, among others. He has collaborated with Luke Holland on a number of studio covers, including a cover of Paramore's 2013 single "Ain't It Fun" for Punk Goes Pop Vol. 6 (2014), Years & Years' 2015 single "King", and Chris Brown's single 2013 single "Fine China".

Career

2008–09: A Path Less Traveled
Carter joined the metalcore band A Path Less Traveled in 2008. He began pursuing an interest in mixing post-hardcore and metalcore elements with electronic and pop influences, which would show in Carter's future musical projects. In A Path Less Traveled, he became acquainted with vocalist Michael Bohn, who would co-front bands with Carter in the future. A Path Less Traveled released their debut extended play, From Here On Out, in 2009, selling over 500 copies. The following year, Carter departed from A Path Less Traveled and began working with Woe, Is Me.

2009–11: Woe, Is Me

Tyler Carter joined the American electronicore band Woe, Is Me, in 2009, eventually signing to Rise Records the same year. With this seven-member line-up, the band recorded a three-song demo with producer Cameron Mizell. After releasing a studio cover of Kesha's 2009 single Tik Tok, on MySpace, the group wrote and recorded their debut studio album with Mizell. Their debut studio album, Number[s], was released on August 30, 2010, on Velocity Records, a subsidiary of Rise Records. With Carter and Bohn still members of Woe, Is Me, the group went on to release the single "Fame > Demise", the following year. Due to complications with the line-up stability and tensions within the group, Carter departed from Woe, Is Me on August 10, 2011.

2012–20: Issues

Following his departure with Woe, Is Me, Tyler Carter began forming together another metalcore musical project. After trying to pursue a solo musical career, Carter expressed his interest in forming a rock band with former members of Woe, Is Me, under the name Issues. Originally, screaming vocalist Michael Bohn, keyboardist Ben Ferris, bassist Cory Ferris, guitarist AJ Rebollo, and drummer Case Snedecor joined the line-up, subsequently signing to Rise Records. The Ferris brothers departed from the group prior to the release of their debut Black Diamonds (EP). The extended play was released on November 13, 2012, which was produced by Kris Crummett and recorded at Interlace Studios in Portland, Oregon. Snedecor left the band in 2013 and was replaced by drummer Josh Manuel while Ben and Cory Ferris were replaced by keyboardist and disc jockey Tyler "Ty" Acord and bassist Skyler Acord, respectively.

The band released their debut studio album, Issues, on February 18, 2014, on Rise Records, which was praised for its DJ-based breakdowns and mixture of metalcore and post-hardcore, charting at No. 9 on the U.S. Billboard 200. The same year, the band released their second EP, Diamond Dreams, on November 18. Their second studio album, Headspace, was released on May 20, 2016.

Bohn announced his departure from the band in January 2018, making Tyler Carter the sole remaining vocalist in the band's line-up. The group's third studio album, Beautiful Oblivion, was released on October 4, 2019, which charted at number 181 on the US Billboard 200 and number 31 on the ARIA Digital Album Chart. In support of the album, they headlined the Beautiful Oblivion Tour in Europe and North America during the fall of 2019.

On September 1, 2020 Carter was removed from the band due to grooming and sexual misconduct allegations made against him.

After his departure from Issues, Carter went on to work on new music under the name Emerald Royce. A demo compilation was released on the group's Instagram page on November 24, 2020.

Solo career

Tyler Carter debuted his solo career being featured on a holiday-inspired song "I Hate the Holidays", by Mat Musto, on December 19, 2010. He featured on American rock band All Things Will End's song "There's No Turning Back", released on August 19, 2012. Carter also appeared on Hands Like Houses' song "Lion Skin", alongside Jonny Craig, from the album Ground Dweller (2012). The following year, he released another holiday song, "Make it Snow", featuring Tyler "Scout" Acord, on December 13.

Carter released his debut extended play, Leave Your Love, on January 13, 2015, on Velocity and Rise Records. On the album, Carter worked with producers blackbear, Ty "Scout" Acord, Boogie and Igloo. He featured on post-hardcore band Jamie's Elsewhere's 2014 single "The Illusionist".

Carter performed live with American rock band PVRIS at the 2015 Alternative Press Music Awards, performing the song "My House".

On December 23, 2015, he released a studio cover of Adele's 2015 single "Hello".

On July 8, 2016, American singer MAX released the Sokko remix of the single "Basement Party", featuring Tyler Carter. On December 20, Carter and Issues drummer Josh Manuel released a cover of "Pokémon Theme", entitled "Gotta Catch 'Em All", featuring Jacky Vincent.

Carter released the solo single, "Forget You", featuring Lophiile, on July 15, 2016. Two years later, he released the single "Pressure", on June 29, 2018. He released a second single, titled "Focus", on August 17. A third single, "Moonshine", was released on September 27, accompanied with its music video.

His debut studio album, Moonshine, was released on February 1, 2019, on Rise Records. In support of the album, he embarked on a headlining U.S. tour with musician Riley in January 2019.

In 2020, Carter collaborated with Japanese musician KSUKE to release the song "Contradiction". The song was used as the opening theme for the anime The God of High School.

Carter released Moonshine Acoustic on June 26, 2020.

In July 2020, Carter announced on Instagram that he had ended his recording contract as a solo artist with Rise Records and declared himself an independent artist, despite remaining signed with the label in Issues.

In December 2020, he announced Emerald Royce, a musical duo consisting of Carter and Chris Linck from metalcore band Attila.

Personal life

Early life

Derek Tyler Carter was born in Habersham County, Georgia, on December 30, 1991. Throughout his early life, he became inspired by R&B, pop, and soul music, finding a passion for singing at a young age. In junior high, he grew interested in alternative rock music, having grown an interest in performing drums and percussion instruments. He performed in a number of bands in Atlanta, Georgia during his time in junior high and high school. Inspired by the likes of Underoath's Aaron Gillespie, Carter decided to pursue singing whilst continuing to drum. He later moved his focus to only singing, where he went on to perform post-hardcore, and R&B inspired rock music. With deep roots in country music, a passion for soul music, and an obsession with boy bands, Carter has become a prominent voice in the metalcore industry, and a face for the LGBTQ in rock music.

Tyler Carter came out as bisexual in 2015. He is an outspoken supporter of the LGBTQ community.

Discography

Solo career
Studio albums
 Moonshine (Rise/Velocity, 2019)

Extended plays
 Leave Your Love (Rise/Velocity, 2015)
 Moonshine Acoustic (Rise, 2020)

Singles
 "Pressure" (Rise/Velocity, 2018)
 "Focus" (Rise, 2018)
 "Moonshine" (Rise, 2018)
 "Good Things" (Rise, 2018)

With Emerald Royce
Singles
 Use Me (Independent, 2020) 
 Where Was I (Independent, 2020)

With Issues
Studio albums
 Issues (Rise, 2014)
 Headspace (Rise, 2016)
 Beautiful Oblivion (Rise, 2019)

Extended plays
 Black Diamonds (Rise, 2012)
 Diamond Dreams (Rise, 2014)

Singles
 "Hooligans" (Rise, 2013)

With Woe, Is Me
Studio albums
 Number[s] (Rise, 2010)

Singles
 "Fame > Demise" (Rise, 2011)

With A Path Less Traveled
 From Here on Out (2010)

Collaborations

References

1991 births
Living people
American male pop singers
American rock singers
Bisexual men
Bisexual musicians
LGBT people from Georgia (U.S. state)
Musicians from Atlanta
Nu metal singers
Rise Records artists
21st-century American singers
American LGBT singers
21st-century American male singers
20th-century American LGBT people
21st-century American LGBT people